Edith Jerry Patterson (born November 18, 1945) is a Democratic member of the Maryland House of Delegates who represents district 28, which is based in Charles County. She previously served as a county commissioner from 2002 to 2010 and a member of the Board of Education for Charles County from 1983 to 1995.

Early life and career
Patterson was born in Doswell, Virginia, on November 18, 1945, where she attended John M. Grandy High School in neighboring Ashland. She attended Virginia Union University in 1968, where she earned a B.S. degree in biology and chemistry. After five years of teaching as a biology and physics teacher in Washington, D.C., she moved to Pomfret, Maryland, in 1973, and attended Bowie State University, where she earned a M.Ed. in guidance and counseling, and George Washington University in 1991, where she earned a Ed.D. in higher education administration. After graduating, she worked as a consultant for various groups, including the Congressional Black Caucus, the United States Department of Education, United States Department of Health and Human Services, and the Carnegie Foundation for the Advancement of Teaching.

In 1983, Patterson was elected to the Charles County Board of Education, becoming the first African American to serve on the board. In her final year on the board, she served as its Chair.

Patterson entered into politics in 2000 when she became a member of the Charles County Democratic Central Committee. In 2005, the Charles County Democratic Central Committee appointed Patterson to serve as county commissioner, filling a vacancy after commissioner F. Wayne Cooper moved up to the board president after Murray D. Levy resigned to fill a vacancy in the Maryland House of Delegates left by the resignation of state delegate Van T. Mitchell. She was the first African American to serve on the council and became the first African American elected commissioner alongside commissioners' Vice President Reuben B. Collins II in 2006. In 2010, Patterson lost her re-election bid to Charles County commissioners' President Candice Quinn Kelly by a margin of 114 votes.

In August 2010, Patterson was elected to serve on the Maryland Association of Counties Board of Directors.

In April 2012, Governor Martin O'Malley appointed Patterson to the Maryland Higher Education Commission. In accepting her appointment, Patterson retired after 37 years from the College of Southern Maryland, where she worked as the longtime director of the college’s Educational Talent Search program.

In February 2014, Patterson again filed to run for Maryland House of Delegates. She came third place in the Democratic primary with 20.8 percent of the vote, squeaking out a narrow victory of about 700 votes. She received 23.78 percent of the vote in the general election.

In 2004 and 2016, Patterson served as a delegate for the Democratic National Committee.

In the legislature
Patterson was sworn into the Maryland House of Delegates on January 14, 2015.

Committee assignments
 Ways and Means Committee, 2015–present (election law subcommittee, 2015, 2017–2018; finance resources subcommittee, 2015–2017; education subcommittee, 2016–2019; local revenues subcommittee, 2019, 2021–present; revenues subcommittee, 2019; early childhood subcommittee, 2020; chair, racing & gaming subcommittee, 2020–present)
 Joint Committee on Ending Homelessness, 2016–present
 House Chair, Protocol Committee, 2019

Other memberships
 House Chair, Charles County Delegation, 2016–present
 Member, Legislative Black Caucus of Maryland, 2015– (2nd vice-chair, 2016–2018; 1st vice-chair, 2018–2019)
 Member, Maryland Veterans Caucus, 2015–present
 2nd Vice-President, Women Legislators of Maryland, 2021–present (member, 2015–present; executive board, at large, 2019–2021)

Political positions

Education
During her 2014 House of Delegates campaign, Patterson said that she supports the objectives of Common Core State Standards, but believes that governments should provide teachers with professional development and training to implement the program.

Following an investigation by Project Baltimore on Maryland private schools, Patterson introduced legislation in the 2019 legislative session that would have required the Maryland Department of Education to provide a list of all non-public schools to local municipalities annually to conduct zoning and fire code inspections. The bill passed the House of Delegates by a vote of 118–17, but was killed by the Senate subcommittee on Education, Health and Environmental Affairs.

In 2022, Patterson said that she opposed legislation introduced by state senator Arthur Ellis that would turn the Charles County campuses of the College of Southern Maryland into a standalone college.

Environment
Patterson co-sponsored legislation introduced in the 2020 legislative session that bans the intentional release of balloons in Maryland.

Marijuana
During her 2014 House of Delegates campaign, Patterson said that she supports the use of marijuana for medical or medicinal purposes under medical supervision and use through state licensed distribution centers, but did not support legalizing recreational marijuana, calling it a "gateway drug". She also said that she supports decriminalizing the possession of small amounts of marijuana.

Taxes
During her 2014 House of Delegates campaign, Patterson said that she supports reviewing regulatory and corporate tax structure and providing tax incentives to start up medium and small technology firms to increase Maryland business competitiveness. She also said that she would support establishing tax-free zones targeted around research and development academic institutions to lure high-technology and cybersecurity business. She supports the intent of Maryland's "rain tax" and "septic bill", but expressed the need to protect support those most affected by the septic bill, especially farmers, through funding at both the state and county level.

Personal life
Patterson was married to Ralph Patterson until his death in 2001. She has three children and two grandchildren and lives in Pomfret, Maryland.

She is a member of the Nu Zeta Omega chapter of the Alpha Kappa Alpha sorority.

Awards
 Women Opening the Pipeline Award, Congressional Black Caucus Education Braintrust, 2006
 Outstanding Achievement in Community Service Award, Maryland State Teachers Association, 2007
 Women Pioneer Award, Charles County Commission for Women, 2010
 Service Award, Charles County Chapter, National Association for the Advancement of Colored People (NAACP), 2011
 Service Award, Tri-County Council for Southern Maryland, 2011
 John Thomas Parran Leadership Award, Charles County Democratic Central Committee, 2012
 Education Leadership Award, Maryland Chapter, National Association for the Advancement of Colored People, 2013
 Maryland's Top 100 Women, Daily Record, 2017, 2019, 2021

Electoral history

References

Democratic Party members of the Maryland House of Delegates
Living people
1945 births
21st-century American politicians
21st-century American women politicians
People from Hanover County, Virginia
Bowie State University alumni
George Washington University alumni
Virginia Union University alumni
Women state legislators in Maryland
African-American state legislators in Maryland
County commissioners in Maryland
School board members in Maryland